In organic chemistry, an α-haloketone is a functional group consisting of a ketone group or more generally a carbonyl group with an α-halogen substituent.  α-haloketones are alkylating agents.  Prominent α-haloketones include phenacyl bromide and chloroacetone.

Structure
The general structure is RR′C(X)C(=O)R where R is an alkyl or aryl residue and X any one of the halogens. 
The preferred conformation of a haloketone is that of a cisoid with the halogen and carbonyl sharing the same plane as the steric hindrance with the carbonyl alkyl group is generally larger.

Haloketone synthesis 
Haloketones and halo carbonyl compounds in general are synthesized by reaction of carbonyl compounds with sources of X+ (X = halogen), which is provided using halogens:
RC(O)CH3  +  X2  →  RC(O)CH2X  +  HX
Specialized sources of electrophilic halogenating agents include N-Bromosuccinimide and 1,3-dibromo-5,5-dimethylhydantoin (DBDMH). In the Nierenstein reaction an acyl chloride reacts with diazomethane

Asymmetric synthesis
Efforts are reported in asymmetric synthesis of halocarbonyls through organocatalysis. In one study an acid chloride is converted into an α-halo-ester with a strong base (sodium hydride), a bromine donor and an organocatalyst based on proline and quinine:

In the proposed reaction mechanism the base first converts the acid chloride to the ketene, the organocatalyst then introduces chirality through its quinonoid tertiary amine, forming a ketene adduct.

Reactions 
Haloketones take part in several reaction types, especially since they are bifunctional, with two electrophilic sites (alpha carbon and carbonyl carbon).  In one manifestation of this duality, they are precursors to heterocycles.  Aminothiazoles are produced by reaction of chloroketones with thiourea and with thioamides. Pyrroles by reaction of haloketones with dicarbonyls and ammonia the Hantzsch pyrrole synthesis.

Illustrative of their alkylating activity are reactions with potassium iodide in acetone, chloroacetone reacts faster than 1-chloropropane by a factor of 36,000.  Haloketones react with phosphites in the Perkow reaction.

Due to the presence of two electron withdrawing groups (carbonyl and halide), The alpha-C-H center is acidic.  This property is exploited in the Favorskii rearrangement, where base abstracts first an acidic α-proton and the resulting carbanion then displaces the halogen.

In crossed aldol reactions between haloketones and aldehydes the initial reaction product is a halohydrin which can subsequently form an oxirane in the presence of base.

The halogroup can be removed in reductive dehalogenation of halo ketones.  Alpha-haloketones can also be converted to alkenes by treatment with hydrazine.

As a ketone, an α-haloketones can react with amines to form an α-haloimine, which can be converted back to the parent haloketone by hydrolysis, so that haloimines may be used as masked versions of haloketones. This allows some chemical transformations to be achieved that is not possible on the parent haloketones directly.

References 

Functional groups